The Ministry of Information, Communication, Technology and Postal Services is a ministry of the Government of South Sudan. The incumbent minister is Michael Makuei Lueth, while Baba Medan serves as deputy minister. 

The ministry functions as the mouthpiece of the government and has the mandate to release government press releases, press statements, and organize public education campaigns. It also offers media organizations opportunities to report on government activities. The ministry also organizes public events with the aim to engage the people of South Sudan in a dialogue with their government.

List of Ministers of Information, Communication Technology and Postal Services

References

Information, Communication Technology and Postal Services
South Sudan
South Sudan, Information, Communication Technology and Postal Services